Corra may refer to:

Places 
 Corra Linn Dam, a concrete hydroelectric dam on the Kootenay River in the Canadian province of British Columbia
 Corra Castle, a ruined 16th-century castle within the Corehouse Estate near New Lanark, Scotland
 Irish name for Currow, County Kerry, Ireland, a village

People 
 Surname
 Bruno Corra, the pseudonym of Bruno Ginanni Corradini (1892–1976), Italian writer and screenwriter
 Henry John Corra (born 1955), American documentary filmmaker 

 William Skinner of Corra (1823–1901), Scottish lawyer and author

 Given name
 Cornelius Wilhelmus "Corra" Dirken (1938–2020), former South African rugby player
 Corra Mae Harris (1869–1935), American writer and journalist

Science 
 Corra (butterfly) a genus of skipper butterflies in the subtribe Moncina

See also 
 Corradi